Ogrodniki may refer to:

Ogrodniki, Gmina Biała Podlaska in Lublin Voivodeship (east Poland)
Ogrodniki, Gmina Tuczna in Lublin Voivodeship (east Poland)
Ogrodniki, Białystok County in Podlaskie Voivodeship (north-east Poland)
Ogrodniki, Bielsk County in Podlaskie Voivodeship (north-east Poland)
Ogrodniki, Hajnówka County in Podlaskie Voivodeship (north-east Poland)
Ogrodniki, Mońki County in Podlaskie Voivodeship (north-east Poland)
Ogrodniki, Sejny County in Podlaskie Voivodeship (north-east Poland)
Ogrodniki, Siemiatycze County in Podlaskie Voivodeship (north-east Poland)
Ogrodniki, Sokółka County in Podlaskie Voivodeship (north-east Poland)
Ogrodniki, Siedlce County in Masovian Voivodeship (east-central Poland)
Ogrodniki, Węgrów County in Masovian Voivodeship (east-central Poland)
Ogrodniki, Warmian-Masurian Voivodeship (north Poland)